Mogens Just Mikkelsen (born 23 October 1962 in Bogense) is a Danish Olympic Star class sailor. He competed in the 1988 and 1992 Summer Olympics, finishing 9th in 1992 together with Benny F. Andersen.

References

Olympic sailors of Denmark
Danish male sailors (sport)
Star class sailors
Sailors at the 1988 Summer Olympics – Star
Sailors at the 1992 Summer Olympics – Star
1962 births
Living people
People from Nordfyn Municipality
Sportspeople from the Region of Southern Denmark